Joseph Louis Jacobs (born 14 August 1993) is a former motorcycle speedway rider from England.

Career
Born in Ipswich, Jacobs began riding motorcycles at the age of four, and took up speedway as a junior, riding for Rye House in the Academy League in 2008, finishing as runner up in the British Under-15 Championship that year. He made his senior debut in 2009 with Mildenhall Fen Tigers in the National League, moving to Rye House Cobras in 2010 after the Fen Tigers closed early in the season. That year he finished as runner up (to Brendan Johnson) in the British Under-18 Championship. He returned to the Fen Tigers in 2011 for a further two seasons before signing for the newly formed Coventry Storm in 2013. He also rode in the Premier League in 2013 for Glasgow Tigers. In 2014 he rode in all three British Leagues, riding for Mildenhall Fen Tigers (NL), Peterborough Panthers then Workington Comets (PL), and Wolverhampton Wolves (Elite League).  

Joe took a year out of the sport in 2015 but returned in 2016 after being offered an Elite League place with Belle Vue Aces.  Following a successful 28-day contract with National League Isle of Wight Islanders as injury cover Joe was signed by Premier League Ipswich Witches in June 2016.

After failing to secure team places for 2017 (although he had a short-term contract mid-season with Berwick Bandits) and 2018, he announced his retirement from the sport in January 2018.

References

1993 births
Living people
English motorcycle racers
British speedway riders
Mildenhall Fen Tigers riders
Rye House Cobras riders
Coventry Storm riders
Glasgow Tigers riders
Wolverhampton Wolves riders